The 1951 United Kingdom general election in Northern Ireland was held on 25 October as part of the wider general election with 12 MPs elected in single-seat constituencies using first-past-the-post.

Results
The Ulster Unionists lost one seat to Jack Beattie, formerly an Independent Labour MP but now standing for the Irish Labour Party. Four Ulster Unionist candidates were returned unopposed, the last UK general election in which any candidates were so returned. The Nationalists also lost one seat to retirement. It was gained by Michael O'Neill, an independent Nationalist.

In the election as a whole, the Labour Party government led by Clement Attlee, which had won with a narrow majority in the previous election, lost out to the Conservative Party, which included the Ulster Unionists, led by Sir Winston Churchill, who returned as Prime Minister.

MPs elected

Footnotes

References

Northern Ireland
1951
1951 elections in Northern Ireland
October 1951 events in the United Kingdom